The CINEOS program (Campo Imperatore Near-Earth Object Survey), started in 2001, is dedicated to the discovery and follow-up of near-Earth objects (NEOs), namely asteroids and comets which periodically approach or intersect the Earth's orbit. In particular CINEOS is addressed to the discovery of Atens and Interior-Earth Objects (IEOs) by extending survey coverage at small solar elongations, and to the discovery of the other kind of NEOs by observing with longer exposures (up to a limiting magnitude of 21) in the opposition region.

Between August 2001 and November 2004, CINEOS measured more than 61000 asteroid positions and discovered more than 1500 new objects, including several NEOs and one cometary centaur, 167P/CINEOS. In June–September 2003, CINEOS was ranked fifth in the world for the number of discoveries (sixth place in the period June–August 2004) and has been the first Italian professional program to discover a NEO and an asteroid beyond the orbit of Jupiter.

The survey is carried out at the Campo Imperatore station of the Rome Observatory near the summit of the Gran Sasso Mountain, at about 2,150 meters of elevation. The station is located about 130 km north-east of Rome. The Observatory of Turin has been also involved in this project. Operated at the Schmidt telescope (60-90–183 cm) available at the station, the program uses between 10 and 14 nights per month, usually around the first and last quarter of the moon.

Objectives 
The science of CINEOS consists of two main observing activities:

NEO discovery 
To search for near-Earth objects (NEOs), concentrating activities at small solar elongations. The objective is to optimize a ground-based system towards the discoveries of:
 Aten asteroids
 Interior-Earth Objects (IEOs)

Although the NEO discovery rate grew significantly from 2001 to 2005, knowledge of bodies with small semimajor axis remains largely incomplete (Atens) or totally incomplete (Inner-Earth Objects). Most search programs concentrate their efforts near the opposition region where it is difficult if not impossible to find these objects.

Aten asteroids are also very important because numerical simulations have shown that they have the highest frequency of close encounters with the Earth. Sometimes Atens can evolve into orbits completely inside that of the Earth and vice versa. Thus, there are bodies that can come very close to the Earth, but are very difficult to observe from the ground.

Astrometry 
The second goal of CINEOS is to provide rapid astrometric data for:
 Follow-up of NEOs in urgent need of observations.
 Recovery of NEOs at future apparitions.
 Follow-up of small bodies belonging to other unusual orbital classes.

The survey activity is carried out mostly at the beginning and near the end of the night, while part of the middle of night time is usually available for the follow-up work. As a targeted follow-up system, CINEOS takes advantage of the combination of the relatively faint limiting magnitude and large field of view (probably the largest in the world for this activity). Follow-up can be provided up to magnitude 21, occasionally to 22 on the best nights.

Coordination of the follow-up work will be accomplished within the Spaceguard Central Node facilities. An essential side of the work is to choose targets that cannot be done elsewhere very easily during the epoch of the observing run.

List of discovered minor planets

See also
List of near-Earth object observation projects

References

External links 
 CINEOS home page

2001 establishments in Italy
Astronomical observatories in Italy
Astronomical surveys
Buildings and structures in Abruzzo

Province of L'Aquila
Projects established in 2001